Soin may refer to:

 Nishiyama Sōin (1605—1682), a haikai-no-renga poet
 Sergei Soin (born 1982), Russian ice hockey player
 Soin (mountain), a mountain in Bavaria, Germany
 Solln, a neighborhood in Munich, Germany, also known as Soin
 Westerners (Korean political faction), romanized as Sŏin using McCune–Reischauer romanization